Alfonso Pérez Muñoz (born 26 September 1972), known simply as Alfonso, is a Spanish former professional footballer who played as a striker.

Having represented both Real Madrid and Barcelona during his career, Alfonso possessed above-average heading ability despite not reaching 180 cm. He appeared in 307 La Liga games for three teams (also had two spells with Real Betis), scoring 84 goals.

The recipient of nearly 40 caps for Spain, Alfonso appeared for the nation in one World Cup and two European Championships.

Club career
Alfonso was born in Getafe, in the outskirts of Madrid. In 1991, aged just 18, he made his professional debut with Real Madrid and, although he never carved a regular place in the starting XI – playing mostly as understudy to Emilio Butragueño first and then Iván Zamorano – helped the capital side to the 1995 national championship.

In the summer of 1995, Alfonso joined Real Betis. In his second year at the Manuel Ruiz de Lopera, he scored 25 La Liga goals which was the most goals by a player in a season in the club's history. Teaming up with Pier, the pair combined for 60 from 1995 to 1997, and helped the Andalusia team finish fourth in the latter.

FC Barcelona signed Alfonso for the 2000–01 campaign. The player had a difficult time adjusting at Camp Nou, netting only twice in his first year and serving an unsuccessful loan spell at French Ligue 1 side Olympique de Marseille in January 2002, alongside Real Madrid's Alberto Rivera.

Barcelona then loaned Alfonso to former club Betis, which signed him permanently at the end of the season. After another two seasons where he struggled with injuries and loss of form (ten scoreless games in 2004–05), he retired from football when his contract expired in June 2005, having scored more than 100 official goals during his career; he subsequently returned to Real Madrid, joining its veterans' team.

International career
Alfonso appeared in 38 games for Spain, making his debut in a friendly with England on 9 September 1992, in Santander. The most important of his 11 goals was scored against Yugoslavia in UEFA Euro 2000: the team was losing 3–2 in injury time, needing a win to qualify from the group at Norway's expense. In the 90th minute, a penalty was won and converted by Gaizka Mendieta, and with seconds remaining Alfonso volleyed a spectacular shot past Ivica Kralj for his second of the game and the win.

Alfonso also took part in all of the matches at Euro 1996, including against Bulgaria in which he scored the equaliser after just one minute on the pitch. Additionally, he played two 1998 FIFA World Cup games.

Alfonso was also a member of the national team that won the gold medal at the 1992 Summer Olympics, in Barcelona.

Personal life
Alfonso is the older brother of another footballer, Iván Pérez Muñoz. Both Real Madrid youth graduates, they coincided one season at Betis and reunited at Real Madrid veterans.

Getafe CF's stadium, the Coliseum Alfonso Pérez, is named after him, despite the fact that he never played professionally for his hometown club (or even once in the ground).

Career statistics
Scores and results list Spain's goal tally first, score column indicates score after each Pérez goal.

Honours
Real Madrid
La Liga: 1994–95
Copa del Rey: 1992–93
Supercopa de España: 1993

Betis
Copa del Rey: 2004–05

Spain U23
Summer Olympic Games: 1992

Individual
Spanish Player of the Year: 1998

References

External links

1972 births
Living people
People from Getafe
Spanish footballers
Footballers from the Community of Madrid
Association football forwards
La Liga players
Segunda División players
Segunda División B players
Tercera División players
Real Madrid C footballers
Real Madrid Castilla footballers
Real Madrid CF players
FC Barcelona players
Real Betis players
Ligue 1 players
Olympique de Marseille players
Spain youth international footballers
Spain under-21 international footballers
Spain under-23 international footballers
Spain international footballers
UEFA Euro 1996 players
1998 FIFA World Cup players
UEFA Euro 2000 players
Olympic footballers of Spain
Footballers at the 1992 Summer Olympics
Olympic medalists in football
Medalists at the 1992 Summer Olympics
Olympic gold medalists for Spain
Spanish expatriate footballers
Expatriate footballers in France
Spanish expatriate sportspeople in France